Thomas Bates (1567–1606) was a member of the Gunpowder Plot.

Thomas Bates may also refer to:

 Thomas Bates (MP) (by 1526–87), MP for Morpeth
 Thomas Bates (surgeon) ( 1704–1719), English surgeon
Thomas Bates (stockbreeder) (1775–1849), English stockbreeder.
 Tom Bates (born 1938), American politician
 The 1962 murder of Thomas Bates, a newsagent in Birmingham, England